Birgit Cunningham (born 6 January 1963) is a British American events organiser, activist, and campaigner for the rights of single mothers.

Early life
Cunningham was born in San Francisco, the daughter of a treasurer of the Bank of America and a German-born mother, and is the eldest of three daughters. When she was nine, her family moved to England and settled at Leatherhead in Surrey. She was educated at Roedean, then earned a degree in history of art at Rutgers University. After that, aged twenty-two, she moved to Paris and worked in an art gallery.

In 1987, Cunningham moved to Chelsea, London, and became a yacht broker in the City of London.

Los Angeles
Moving to Los Angeles, she took a job as personal assistant to a vice-president of Universal Pictures and shared a house with Elizabeth Hurley and Julia Verdin. In 1993, William Cash thanked Cunningham for her help with his book Educating William: Memoirs of a Hollywood Correspondent.

In the late 1990s, Cunningham dated Kevin Costner for three years, but the relationship came to an end. She had a breakdown, and after drinking a bottle of tequila became unconscious and found herself in hospital, later deciding to move back to England.

Later life
After her return from California, Cunningham joined Alcoholics Anonymous. She lived for a time in a commune in Devon, joining Greenpeace, and working for The Ecologist magazine and the Green Party. In 1999, she helped to persuade Sting, Jude Law, Simon and Yasmin Le Bon and Sadie Frost to support an organic picnic in Greenwich. As an events organiser, she co-ordinated green protests against GM food.

In February 2000, at a conference of the National Farmers' Union, as a protest against a financial crisis for small farmers, Cunningham squashed a chocolate éclair into the face of Nick Brown, the Labour government's Minister of Agriculture, Fisheries and Food. Later she said she had "just flipped" and was sorry. Zac Goldsmith, editor of The Ecologist, commented that Cunningham was likely to be helping the magazine to hold its own conference on "the real farm crisis". Brown said to The Guardian "It was not a samurai sword. It was a chocolate eclair. Although I am not a particularly brave person, I am not frightened of chocolate eclairs." In the words of the New Statesman, "The farmers were content to growl their protests while the politicians spun their policy; so Birgit Cunningham took gooey matter into her own hands and – splat! – pushed her cause (and herself) onto an unsuspecting nation."

In 2001 Cunningham took a job with the Green Party, working as senior press officer for the Green members of the newly established London Assembly.

For eight months of 2001, she was in a relationship with Harry Nuttall, a racing driver she had known before leaving for California. Troubles set in during October 2001, when she became pregnant, and their son Jack was born in June 2002. According to Cunningham's own account, Nuttall at first accepted responsibility for the child, but over the following months, in her words, "slowly, he disappeared from my life". At Christmas 2001, Nuttall met another woman, and they were married in July 2002. Cunningham took her story to the press, and a long feature appeared in the Evening Standard the day before Nuttall's wedding, revealing the birth of his son two weeks before. Cunningham commented at the time that Nuttall was "...just about the poorest man I ever dated. He didn't really register on my Richter scale". Nuttall continued to dispute his role in the birth of his son until forced to take a paternity test. However, within months he had persuaded the Child Support Agency (CSA) that he could afford only £5.40 a week in child maintenance.

Cunningham took a one-year paralegal course at Westminster College, and alongside her own dispute over child support she began a long-running campaign to reform the child support system. She formed a group called Babies for Justice (which later merged with Mothers for Justice), and organised a protest march to Downing Street. In 2004, she gave evidence to the House of Commons Work and Pensions Committee for its report on the performance of the Child Support Agency. A court hearing in 2005 confirmed the level of support from Nuttall as £5.40 a week, and on the way out of court Cunningham kneed Nuttall in the groin. She was charged with assault and appeared in a magistrate's court in November 2006, pleading "guilty as hell". After explaining the background to the case she received a conditional discharge.

Nuttall's father, Sir Nicholas paid the airfares for a visit to his grandson in the Bahamas in 2005, and in July 2007, a few days before his death, arranged a final meeting. After that, Cunningham asked the CSA for a child support review, but Nuttall then claimed to have no income at all, and the payments of £5.40 ended. A claim in the family division of the High Court failed to award any child support, after the judge, Mr Justice Singer, had asked "Do you seriously expect Mr Nuttall to sell his shooting rifles for child maintenance?"

As revealed in 2011, between late 2003 and the early weeks of 2011 Cunningham had three encounters with Thomas Strathclyde, Conservative Leader in the House of Lords, explaining that he had initially offered to help with her campaign but was only interested in sex. In 2011 Cunningham sold this story to a London newspaper, the Sunday Mirror, after hearing that the government had plans to make parents pay for using the services of the CSA. She commented "I’m talking about this now because I’m fed up of this Government's hypocrisy and how they preach to us about family values." In February 2011 she offered a public apology to Lady Strathclyde.

In 2011 Cunningham was reported to be suffering from back pain caused by scoliosis and degenerative disc disease, diagnosed in 2006. In 2012, she was in a wheelchair and hoping for surgery.

Birgit Cunningham's son Jack Cunningham-Nuttall is an actor who has taken lessons at the Sylvia Young Theatre School, London, and the Michael Howard Studios in New York City. He appeared as Young Hamlet in the film Ophelia (2018).

Notes

External picture links
Picture with eclair, February 2000, at Alamy.com
Downing Street Farmers protest picture 1 at Alamy.com
Downing Street Farmers protest picture 2 at Alamy.com
Food Labelling Campaign picture at Alamy.com
Environment Campaigner Birgit Cunningham with Harry Nuttall, 1993, by Landmark Media at imagecollect.com
Mrs Gijsberk Groenwegen and Birgit Cunningham at Sotheby's New Collectors Party 14 September 2000 at Tatler.com
Lady Lara Compton and Birgit Cunningham at Samantha Shaw Preview, 15 January 1998 in The Tatler

1963 births
Green Party of England and Wales people
Living people
People educated at Roedean School, East Sussex
Rutgers University alumni
Activists from San Francisco